Kathleen Joan Venn  (12 November 1926 – 26 May 2019) was an Australian politician. Born in Tasmania, she was a Labor member of the Tasmanian Legislative Council from 1976 to 1982, representing the seat of Hobart. In 1982, she was defeated. She ran for the Senate in the 1984 election as an independent affiliated with Senator Brian Harradine, and received 8.6% of the vote, but preferences from Labor and the Nuclear Disarmament Party gave the seventh seat to Democrat Norm Sanders, who had 6% of the vote.
In 2005 Venn was inducted to the Tasmanian Honour Roll of Women for service to the Community.

References

1926 births
2019 deaths
Independent politicians in Australia
Members of the Tasmanian Legislative Council
Australian Labor Party members of the Parliament of Tasmania
Recipients of the Medal of the Order of Australia
Women members of the Tasmanian Legislative Council